TTX may refer to:

 Cessna 400 (also Cessna TTx), a single-engine aircraft
 Tetrodotoxin, a neurotoxin discovered in aquatic animals
 Tilting Train Express, a South Korean experimental train
 Tinyatoxin, a highly irritant analog of resiniferatoxin and capsaicin
 Trenitalia Tper, an Italian railway company
 TTX Company, a railroad freight car provider
 Mungalalu Truscott Airbase, IATA airport code "TTX"